William Burn was an architect.

William Burn may also refer to:

William John Burn, Anglican colonial bishop
William Wallace Allison Burn, aviator

See also
William Burns (disambiguation)
William Byrne (disambiguation)